Lathyrus sphaericus is a species of wild pea known by the common names grass pea and round-seeded vetchling. It is native to Eurasia and much of Africa, and it is known on other continents as an introduced species. It can grow in many types of habitat, including disturbed areas. This is an annual herb producing a slender stem and bearing leaves each made up of two long, narrow, grasslike leaflets up to 6 centimeters long and a coiling, climbing tendril. The inflorescence is made up of one pea flower on a stalk one or two centimeters long ending a in a bristle. The flower is roughly a centimeter long and deep orange-red or dull red in color. The fruit is a hairless legume pod marked with longitudinal stripes.

References

External links
Jepson Manual Treatment

Photo gallery

Lathyrus sphaericus Israel Wildflowers

spahaericus
Flora of Africa
Flora of Asia
Flora of Europe
Flora of Serbia